Nola Thorne (born c.1919) was a Panamanian track and field athlete. She was known as one of the most memorable women to have emerged from the country of Panama mainly due to her achievement of clinching 3 gold medals at the inaugural edition of the  Central American and Caribbean Games in 1938.

Thorne claimed gold medals in the women's 100m, sprint hurdles and 4×100m relay events during the 1938 Central American and Caribbean Games.

References 

Year of birth uncertain
Possibly living people
Panamanian female sprinters
Panamanian female hurdlers
Competitors at the 1938 Central American and Caribbean Games
Central American and Caribbean Games gold medalists for Panama
Central American and Caribbean Games medalists in athletics